State Road 526 (NM 526) is a  state highway in the US state of New Mexico. NM 526's southern terminus is at NM 72 east-northeast of Raton, and the northern terminus is at County Road 85.5 (CR 85.5) by Lake Moloya at the Colorado–New Mexico border. It follows Chicorica Creek for its entire length.

Major intersections

See also

References

526
Transportation in Colfax County, New Mexico